Foussballclub Differdange 03 is a football club based in Differdange, Luxembourg.

History
Differdange 03 was formed in 2003 as an amalgam of two clubs from the city of Differdange: FA Red Boys Differdange and AS Differdange. When the clubs merged, in time for the 2003–04 season, Red Boys was languishing in the bottom half of the Division of Honour, while AS was in mid-table position in the third tier of Luxembourgian football. The new club took Red Boys league position, and was promoted back into the National Division in the 2005–06 season, when the top division was expanded from twelve clubs to fourteen.

Red Boys Differdange had previously been one of the largest and most successful teams in Luxembourgian football, having won the Luxembourg Cup more times than any other team (15). During the 1920s and 1930s, Red Boys competed with Spora Luxembourg for dominance of Luxembourgian football. Red Boys was the more successful of the two, and won thirteen trophies in as many years between 1923 and 1936. Despite the staunch competition (Spora won 8 trophies in the same period), this record has never been matched.

In the 2011–12 UEFA Europa League Differdange 03 progressed to the 3rd qualifying round of the competition after they eliminated Levadia Tallinn 1–0 on aggregate, one of the club's most famous European victories and one of the most historic victories for a club from Luxembourg has ever had in European Competitions. In the 3rd qualifying round they met Olympiakos Volou and lost 3–0 in both legs, 6–0 on aggregate. However, as Olympiakos Volou was presumably involved in a corruption case, UEFA decided on 11 August 2011 that Differdange would progress to the play-off round and meet Paris Saint-Germain, the furthest a club from Luxembourg has reached in European competitions.

In June 2012, after a poor season in BGL League in which they placed 4th, FCD03 changed coach and Paolo Amodio was exempted. Michel Leflochmoan was appointed as new coach as he is familiar in BGL League: with the F91 Dudelange and with Jeunesse Esch he won multiple championships in Luxembourg.

On 5 and 12 July 2012, FCD03 won against NSÍ Runavík for the first round of qualifying for Europe League with 3–0 and 0–3, with a total of 6 goals in two games. In the second round, FC Differdange 03 faced Belgian club Gent, but were eliminated with an aggregate of 2–4.

On 18 July 2013, they defeated the Dutch club Utrecht in the first leg of 2nd qualifying round of the UEFA Europa League for 2–1. Omar Er Rafik scored both goals. And on 25 July 2013 the made a 3–3 draw against Utrecht in the return, eliminating the Dutch club, which is significantly larger than Differdange, in the UEFA Europa League

Honours

As Red Boys Differdange
National Division
Winners (6): 1922–23, 1925–26, 1930–31, 1931–32, 1932–33, 1978–79
Runners-up (14): 1910–11*, 1926–27, 1933–34, 1934–35, 1957–58, 1973–74, 1975–76, 1979–80, 1980–81, 1983–84, 1984–85, 2008–09**, 2014–15**, 2016–17
Luxembourg Cup
Winners (19, record): 1924–25, 1925–26, 1926–27, 1928–29, 1929–30, 1930–31, 1933–34, 1935–36, 1951–52, 1952–53, 1957–58, 1971–72, 1978–79, 1981–82, 1984–85, 2009–10**, 2010–11**, 2013–14**, 2014–15**
Runners-up (11): 1923–24, 1931–32, 1934–35, 1947–48, 1949–50, 1954–55, 1969–70, 1976–77, 1985–86, 1989–90***, 2012–13**

 *as Sporting Club Differdange
 **as FC Differdange 03
 ***as AS Differdange

European competitions

As Red Boys Differdange
Red Boys Differdange qualified for UEFA European competition ten times.

UEFA European Cup
First round (1): 1979–80

UEFA Cup Winners' Cup
First round (3): 1972–73, 1982–83, 1985–86

UEFA Cup
First round (6): 1974–75, 1976–77, 1977–78, 1980–81, 1981–82, 1984–85

Red Boys never progressed past the first tie in any European competition. They won one match in Europe, winning their 1979 UEFA European Cup first leg 2–1 against Omonia Nicosia before losing 6–1 in Cyprus. In the 1984 UEFA Cup, Red Boys managed a surprise goalless draw with Ajax, but were crushed 14–0 in the return, which remains a UEFA Cup record.

As FC Differdange 03
In the 2013–14 UEFA Europa League Differdange progressed to the 3rd qualifying round of the competition after they eliminated Utrecht 5–4 on aggregate.
Overall, Differdange's record in European competition reads:
Updated 26 July 2013

Notes
Note: Olympiakos Volou disqualified by involvement in match-fixing. UEFA replaced them with Differdange.

Current squad
Updated 5 February, 2023.

Out on loan

Staff
Head coach:  Paolo Amodio
Assistant coach:  Emilio Lobo
Goalkeeper coach:  Patrick Worré

Former coaches
 Dan Theis (20 Nov 2003 – 30 June 2006)
 Roland Schaack (1 July 2008 – 30 June 2009)
 Dan Theis (1 July 2009 – 10 April 2011)
 Maurice Spitoni (caretaker) (10 April 2011 – 30 June 2011)
 Paolo Amodio (1 July 2011 – 30 June 2012)
 Michel Le Flochmoan (1 July 2012 – 30 June 2014)
 Marc Thomé (1 July 2014 – 30 June 2016)
 Pascal Carzaniga (1 July 2016 – )

References

External links
 FC Differdange 03 official website 

Differdange 03
Differdange 03
Association football clubs established in 2003
2003 establishments in Luxembourg